Sam Dealey is an American journalist and media consultant, and the former Editor of The Washington Times. He is currently managing principal at Monument Communications, a media fellow at the Hoover Institution, and a board member at the American Spectator.

Education and early career
A native of Dallas, Dealey graduated from St. Mark's School of Texas in 1992. He became interested in journalism while at Cornell University. During his sophomore year he worked in Washington D.C. at the National Journalism Center and for political columnist Robert Novak. While at Cornell he also worked for the National Review. Upon graduation he moved down to the capital and began writing for The American Spectator, eventually becoming the paper's assistant managing editor. He then joined The Hill newspaper as a political reporter. In 1999, Dealey joined the Wall Street Journal's editorial page as a writer and editor in Hong Kong, covering Southeast Asia, China, the Koreas, and human and religious freedoms.

Dealey is related to George Dealey, Edward Musgrove Dealey, and Robert Decherd, all of whom led the A.H. Belo media conglomerate.

The Washington Times
In January 2010 he was hired by the Washington Times as editor-in-chief. In November 2010 he was let go by the Times after a change of ownership. He was a partner at the public relations and lobbying firm, Qorvis, before taking his position at Monument Communications.

Awards
 Henry R. Luce Award for Deadline Reporting (TIME Magazine)

See also
Notable alumni of St. Mark's School of Texas

References

American male journalists
Cornell University alumni
Living people
The Washington Times people
St. Mark's School (Texas) alumni
Year of birth missing (living people)